Perspective correction may refer to:

Perspective control procedure for editing photographs
Perspective distortion for perspective handling in images
Perspective correction in texture mapping

See also
 Distortion (optics)